Richard Marsden Reece, FSA (born 1939) is a numismatist and retired academic.

Biography
Reece completed a degree in biochemistry at University College London in 1961, before moving to Wadham College, Oxford, where he completed a diploma in education the following year. He taught at the private St John's School in Leatherhead for three years before becoming Head of Chemistry at St George’s School in Harpenden in 1966.

He left teaching in 1968 to undertake a doctorate at Wadham College, Oxford, which he completed in 1972 with a thesis tiled "A survey of denominations and categories in the currency of the western Roman Empire, with special reference to hoards and site finds in Britain". He joined the London Institute of Archaeology as a lecturer in 1970. Promoted to a senior lecturer in 1981, he was made Reader in Late Roman Archaeology and Numismatics. He has been an emeritus reader at UCL since retiring in 1999.

Honours and awards 
On 5 May 1969, Reece was elected a Fellow of the Society of Antiquaries of London (FSA). He was made an honorary fellow of the Royal Numismatic Society (RNS) in 2003. The RNS presented him with Medal of the Royal Numismatic Society six years later. In 2014, he was awarded the British Academy's Derek Allen Prize for numismatics.

Selected works

References

External links

Living people
1939 births
British numismatists
Alumni of University College London
Alumni of Wadham College, Oxford
Academics of the University of London
Academics of University College London